Cryptolechia mataea is a moth in the family Depressariidae. It was described by Edward Meyrick in 1910. It is found in southern India.

The wingspan is 15–17 mm. The forewings are whitish ochreous yellow and the hindwings are grey.

References

Moths described in 1910
Cryptolechia (moth)
Taxa named by Edward Meyrick